Sutton Scotney railway station is a disused station which served the village of Sutton Scotney a few miles north of Winchester on the Didcot, Newbury and Southampton Railway.

Facilities
It was the last station to use the standard design station buildings on the southbound platform. As per most stations there was a passing loop and a single siding and the station did see considerable goods traffic from local farms including watercress and pigs.

Map

Routes

References

Disused railway stations in Hampshire
Former Great Western Railway stations
Railway stations in Great Britain opened in 1885
Railway stations in Great Britain closed in 1942
Railway stations in Great Britain opened in 1943
Railway stations in Great Britain closed in 1960